The Australian Stumpy Tail Cattle Dog or Stumpy is a naturally bobtailed  or tailless, medium-sized cattle dog similar and/or related to the Australian Cattle Dog which is commonly referred to as a “Heeler”, whereas, the Stumpy is not. The Australian Stumpy Tail Cattle Dog was developed in Australia  to herd cattle, and descends from crosses between European herding dogs and the Australian dingo. The name is spelled both with hyphenation, and without, and while the shorter name Stumpy is sometimes applied, the name Heeler most often refers to the Australian Cattle Dog .

History 
There are a number of theories on the origin of the Australian Stumpy Tail Cattle Dog. One is that it descended from Halls Heelers, a dog produced from crossing the Northumberland Blue Merle Drovers dogs with other herding breed. Some early dog breeders believed Dalmatian and Australian Kelpies were included. Some believe that Bull Terrier heritage may have occurred. Others believe that this dog developed from crossing first the Black Bobtail Smithfield herding dog of England, which were brought to Australia in the early 19th century, with the dingo to produce the Red Bobtail, and then crossing with the Smooth-haired Blue Merle Collie. Records of working dogs are scarce from this time period, and there are differing accounts of the breed's development. One is that a drover named Timmins from Bathurst, New South Wales, crossed the Smithfield dogs with dingoes, producing a type of working dog called Timmins' Biters. In order to mute their dingo characteristics and make the dogs easier to handle, further crosses were made with Smooth Collies, producing speckled red and blue dogs that were often born tailless.

In the book A Dog Called Blue, author Noreen Clark makes the case that both the tailless Heeler and the Australian Cattle Dog (a.k.a. "Queensland Heeler") descended at one point from the same stock, called Halls Heelers, kept in the 1830s by a very large cattle operation run by Thomas Hall. The dogs were also crosses of Smithfield dogs and dingoes, but the breeds diverged at some point in the late 20th century. Selective breeding of the tailless or short-tailed dogs has fixed the characteristic of today's breed.

Breed recognition 

The Stumpy has been recognised as a standardised breed since 1988 in its native country by the Australian National Kennel Council, in its "Group 5 (Working dogs)". It is also recognised by the nearby New Zealand Kennel Club in its "Working" group.

More internationally, the breed was provisionally accepted by the Fédération Cynologique Internationale in 2005, as breed standard 351, in "Group 1, Section 2: Cattle Dogs (Except Swiss Cattle Dogs)".   it is also recognised as simply the Stumpy Tail Cattle Dog by the US United Kennel Club (in its "Herding Dog Breeds" group) since 1996, and by the longer name in the Canadian Kennel Club (in its "Group VII: Herding Dogs"), but not by the Kennel Club (UK), nor by the American Kennel Club.

The breed may also be listed by minor kennel clubs, working or herding dog clubs, or Internet-based dog registry businesses, and promoted as a rare breed pet.

Appearance 

The Stumpy is a normally proportioned, rugged dog with pricked (standing up) ears and long legs. The breed's most distinctive feature, for which the breed is named, is the frequent lack of a tail. When there is a tail, it is quite short, no longer than 10 cm (4 in.), and undocked. The coat is medium length to short, straight, dense and harsh. The coat color is a speckled red or speckled blue. ASTCD’s do not show brown points or markings as seen on the ACD. Blue Heelers (a.k.a. "Queensland Heeler") (with a long tail) is similar in appearance to the Stumpy, but the Australian Cattle Dog is proportionally heavier, less leggy and has brown points and markings.

Temperament 

The ideal temperament of the Stumpy is described in the breed standard as alert and watchful, as well as responsive to its owner and reserved around strangers, but also notes that "it must be amenable to handling" at shows. All working dogs need early socialisation with people, and consistent training and activity throughout their lives.

Activities 

Stumpies can compete in dog agility trials, obedience, showmanship, flyball, tracking, frisbee and herding events. Herding instincts and trainability can be measured at noncompetitive herding tests. Stumpies exhibiting basic herding instincts and can be trained to compete in herding trials.

See also
 Dogs portal
 List of dog breeds
 Anatomical terms of location
 Dog terminology

References

External links 
 

FCI breeds
Herding dogs
Dog breeds originating in Australia